Eltaj Safarli (born 18 May 1992 in Baku) is an Azerbaijani chess Grandmaster. In October 2016, he reached his all-time-highest rating of 2694 and was ranked as No. 3 in Azerbaijan and No. 46 in the world.

He entered tournaments from the age of 6, with modest success. Safarli won the Azerbaijan Championships in 2010 and 2016. He won the under 10 World Youth Chess Championship in Heraklion in 2002.

Team competitions
Safarli played in the silver medal-winning Azerbaijani team at the European Team Chess Championship in Porto Carras in 2011, alongside Shakhriyar Mamedyarov, Teimour Radjabov, Vugar Gashimov and Qadir Huseynov.

Notable tournament victories
 2010 Mikhail Chigorin Memorial, Saint Petersbourg, 1st
 Winner of Azerbaijan Chess Championship (2016)
 Co-winner of the Tata Steel Challengers Tournament 2016 (+6-1=5)

References

External links

1992 births
Living people
Chess players from Baku
Chess grandmasters
World Youth Chess Champions